Saraya al-Khorasani ( "The Companies of al-Khorasani"), also known as the 18th Brigade of the Popular Mobilization Forces, is a Shia Islamist militia formed in 2013 and engaged in the Second Iraqi Civil War and Syrian Civil War.

Foundation 
The militia was first founded in 1986, and it was a small organization called "Al-Karrar Brigade”, which was led by Yassin Al-Moussawi, the representative of the religious authority, Muhammad Baqir al-Hakim, but the real starting point was in 1995, where it was called the "Tali'a Organization", which opposed the Iraqi government at the time and formed armed groups. It targeted the Ba'ath Party regime in the southern governorates and took the location of Hawr Al-Jbayish and Nasiriyah as a place to attack, then after the marshes were drained by Saddam Hussein, it moved to the deserts of Najaf and Karbala. It claims that it carried over 70 attacks against the Iraqi Ba'ath Party.

The modern Saraya al-Khorasani militia was created in September 2013 with the support of Iran. It is the armed branch of an Iraqi political party, "Hezb Taleea al-Islamiya". It succeeds an older militia known as "Saraya al-Karar".

Ideology
The group takes its name from Abu Muslim al-Khorasani, an 8th-century Muslim leader. The militia initially was named “Saraya Tali'a al-Khorasani”, which means “Forces obedient to the Sayyid of Khorasan”, with "Sayyid" referring to Sayyid Ali Khamenei, the Supreme Leader of Iran. Although the recruitment of this force is essentially Iraqi, its logo is imitated from that of the Iranian Islamic Revolutionary Guard Corps. Its ideology is based on Shiite Islam with marked references to Ali's family.

Leadership
Hamid Taqavi, known as Abu Mariam, an Arab from Iran, general of the Islamic Revolutionary Guard Corps, is said to have been the first leader or a military adviser to the group. He was killed by a sniper on December 28, 2014, near Samarra. Since then, the secretary-general of the militia has been Ali al-Yasiri. The latter was injured in November 2014, in the province of Diyala. His deputy is Hamid al Jaza'iri. In 2015, Saraya al-Khorasani went from 1,500 to 3,000 men according to Reuters.

See also
 Islamic Resistance Movement of Azerbaijan

References

Militias in Asia
Khomeinist groups
Rebel groups in Iraq
Popular Mobilization Forces
Anti-ISIL factions in Iraq
Jihadist groups in Iraq
Paramilitary organizations based in Iraq